Hesar-e Agh Bolagh (also Romanized as Ḩeşār-e Āgh Bolāgh; also known as Ḩeşār-e Āqbolāgh and Ḩeşār-e Āq Bolāgh) is a village in Baranduzchay-ye Jonubi Rural District, in the Central District of Urmia County, West Azerbaijan Province, Iran. At the 2006 census, its population was 424, in 73 families.

References 

Populated places in Urmia County